Ebrahim Matinian (born: Khuzestan) is a principlist representative of Ramhormoz and Ramshir in the Islamic Consultative Assembly (the Parliament of Iran) who was elected at the 11th Majles elections on 21 February 2020 and captured approximately 25,000 votes.

Matinian who is a Twelver Shia Muslim, is considered as one of the 18 representatives of Khuzestan provinces at the current "Islamic Consultative Assembly" (11th parliament).

Ebrahim Matinian's electoral rivals (in the 11th parliament elections) were: Iqbal Mohammadian 16 thousand and 500 votes, Ahmad Hamid 7 thousand 463 votes, Ali Mousavi 4,852 votes, Farshid Kolahkaj 4,703 votes, Omid Hosseinzadeh 3 thousand 277 votes, Hafizullah Mirzaei 1,418 votes, Massoud Shirali one thousand and 59 votes, Gholamreza Taheri 953 votes, Ibrahim Hamid 654 votes, Abbas Khaledi 497 votes, Ibrahim Maliki 177 votes, Abbas Jahanatabnejad 142 votes, Amir Hossein Chamian 111 votes.

See also
 List of Iran's parliament representatives (11th term)

References

Members of the Islamic Consultative Assembly by term
Members of the 11th Islamic Consultative Assembly
Iranian politicians
Living people
1960 births
People from Khuzestan Province